The Royal College of Art (RCA) is a public research university in London, United Kingdom, with campuses in South Kensington, Battersea and White City. It is the only entirely postgraduate art and design university in the United Kingdom. It offers postgraduate degrees in art and design to students from over 60 countries.

History

The RCA was founded in Somerset House in 1837 as the Government School of Design or Metropolitan School of Design. Richard Burchett became head of the school in 1852. In 1853 it was expanded and moved to Marlborough House, and then, in 1853 or 1857, to South Kensington, on the same site as the South Kensington Museum. It was renamed the Normal Training School of Art in 1857 and the National Art Training School in 1863. During the later 19th century it was primarily a teacher training college; pupils during this period included George Clausen, Christopher Dresser, Luke Fildes, Kate Greenaway and Gertrude Jekyll.

In September 1896 the school received the name Royal College of Art, and the emphasis of teaching there shifted to the practice of art and design. Teaching of graphic design, industrial design and product design began in the mid-twentieth century. The school expanded further in the 1960s, and in 1967 it received a royal charter which gave it the status of an independent university with the power to grant its own degrees.

In July 2020, the Royal College of Art launched its first-ever online graduate exhibition, RCA2020.

Campuses

The RCA today has three campuses located in South Kensington, Battersea and White City.

The Darwin Building in Kensington Gore. South Kensington, was completed 1960–1963. It is a short distance from the RCA's home 1896–1967 in the Henry Cole Building, now part of the V&A Museum. The Darwin Building was designed by a team of RCA staff members, H. T. Cadbury-Brown, Hugh Casson and Robert Goodden. and since 2001 has been a Grade II listed building. It is named after painter Sir Robert Vere Darwin, known as Robin Darwin, who was RCA Rector at the time it was commissioned. Although there was modest development into the mews behind the Darwin Building, the restricted site meant further expansion had to be in another part of London.

In 1991 the sculpture department moved to a converted factory in Battersea. In the early 2000s the college conceived a substantial extension on the site, with a minibus service linking it to Kensington. After a redevelopment by Wright & Wright (budget £4.3m, floor area 2,500 sq m), the Sculpture Building opened in Battersea in January 2009. In 2018 the RCA was granted planning permission to redevelop the Sculpture building into a new Arts & Humanities building, designed by Herzog & de Meuron, with work planned for completion in late 2021.

A masterplan was commissioned from Haworth Tompkins  and phase one of their three-phase design was completed with the opening of the Sackler Building on 19 November 2009, to house the painting department. Its name commemorates a major gift by The Dr Mortimer and Theresa Sackler Foundation.

The Dyson Building, named in honour of James Dyson, whose charity donated £5m towards the £21m cost, was opened on 24 September 2012. It houses printmaking and photography, and contains an innovation wing where start-up designers can launch their businesses. The Woo Building was opened on 30 September 2015, completing the Battersea project. It is named in honour of Sir Po-Shing and Lady Helen Woo, who have funded scholarships at the RCA since the 1990s. It accommodates the Ceramics & Glass and Jewellery & Metal programmes. The building's anodised aluminium gates were designed by alumnus Max Lamb.

In 2017 RCA White City became the third RCA campus, co-located with the BBC Media Village and accommodating the School of Communication, Animation and Digital Direction and Communication Design  in buildings designed by Allies and Morrison.

Courses
The RCA offers a Graduate Diploma pre-masters conversion programme, MA, MRes, MPhil and PhD degrees in twenty-eight subject areas, divided into four schools: architecture, arts & humanities, communication, and design. The history of design programme is in collaboration with the Victoria and Albert Museum; there are two double MA/MSc programmes with Imperial College London.

In addition to formal qualifications the RCA also offers Summer school and Executive education courses throughout the year. English for academic purposes (EAP) courses are offered to applicants who need to improve their academic English ability to meet the college's entry requirements.

In early 2019, the RCA announced the launch of its new GenerationRCA programme. GenerationRCA -among other initiatives- will also "inject science disciplines into the mix of creative disciplines traditionally on offer." The new programmes will include Environmental Architecture and Digital Direction; with future programmes centred on nano and soft robotics, computer science, and machine learning, material science and the circular economy.

Rankings
In 2022, the RCA was placed first in the art and design subject area in the QS World University Rankings published by Quacquarelli Symonds for the eighth year in a row, with an overall score of 99.6/100.

In August 2015 it was ranked first on a list of master's courses in fashion by Business of Fashion, a fashion website.

In April 2011 the RCA was ranked first on a list of UK graduate art schools compiled by Modern Painters magazine from a survey of professionals in the art world.

In the Research Assessment Exercise of December 2008, 40% of the research output of the school received the highest (4* or "world-leading") assessment, the third-highest rating in the art and design subject area; over all subject areas only about fifty institutions received a higher rating.

Alumni

The Royal College of Art and its predecessor schools have numerous notable alumni.

Among those who studied in the RCA predecessor bodies in the nineteenth century were Sir George Clausen, Christopher Dresser, Sir Luke Fildes, Kate Greenaway, Gertrude Jekyll and Edwin Lutyens.

Alumni from the twentieth and twenty-first centuries include the sculptors Barbara Hepworth and Henry Moore, painters Frank Auerbach, David Hockney, Bridget Riley, Sir Peter Blake, Gavin Turk and Charles Tunnicliffe, artists Jake and Dinos Chapman, Tracey Emin and R. B. Kitaj, fashion designers Ossie Clark and Zandra Rhodes, industrial designers James Dyson, Sir Jonathan Ive and David Mellor, film directors Tony and Ridley Scott, writer Travis Jeppesen, designers Thomas Heatherwick and architect Sir David Adjaye, prominent member of the suffragette movement Sylvia Pankhurst, the musician Ian Dury, sound artist Janek Schaefer, and the actor Alan Rickman.

The Royal College of Art Society amalgamated with OSARCA (the Old Students Association of the RCA 1912) for the benefit of graduates and associates of the Royal College of Art.

Faculty

Academic and research staff include:

On February 25, 2021, Virgil Abloh joined staff as a Visiting Professor  "to reinforce the importance of education and hands on mentorship of future generations."

Awards and prizes
The Royal College of Art has several awards and prizes which it confers on its graduating students. These include the Sheila Robinson Drawing Prize.

See also
 Armorial of UK universities
 List of art universities and colleges in Europe
 List of universities in the UK
 Visual arts education

References

Further reading

 Christopher Frayling, The Royal College of Art: 150 Years of Art & Design (1987)

 
Educational institutions established in 1837
Art schools in London
Design schools
Higher education colleges in London
Universities and colleges in London
Communication design
Graphic design schools
1837 establishments in England
Battersea
South Kensington
Grade II listed buildings in the Royal Borough of Kensington and Chelsea
Universities UK